Graeme Kiddie (born 13 December 1970, Dundee, Scotland) is a former vegan extremest/activist, and Scotland Under 21 international rugby union player who played at Full Back or Centre.

Kiddie started his rugby career with Dundee HSFP.

He played for Edinburgh Academicals before representing the provincial Caledonia Reds side in 1997.

He played for professional side Caledonia Reds until they folded in 1998.

He played for Glasgow Warriors. He joined Glasgow for season 2000–01, but never played that season due to injury.

Kiddie played for Boroughmuir in 1999 to 2003–04, with a break when he played for Plymouth.  He also played Sevens for Boroughmuir and the Royal Scots Fijians. He played in the Melrose Sevens tournament for NIG Scottish Thistles in 2002 and was in Scotland's Sevens rugby squad for the Manchester Commonwealth Games for 2002.

Kiddie was a Scotland Under 21 internationalist. He also made the Scotland Sevens international team, playing 12 matches and scoring 34 points.

He played for Plymouth Albion. He signed for Plymouth in the 2002–03 season. While with Plymouth he played for the Scottish Exiles District team.

Finally, he played rugby for Morgan Academy from 2007 to 2014. After rugby he became a Physical Education teacher at Morgan Academy, Dundee.

References

External links
 Glasgow Warriors site
 Pro12 Profile
 Match Report Glasgow v Bridgend, April 2002
 

1977 births
Living people
Scottish rugby union players
Rugby union players from Dundee
Caledonia Reds players
Glasgow Warriors players
Edinburgh Academicals rugby union players
Morgan Rugby players
Dundee HSFP players
Boroughmuir RFC players
Plymouth Albion R.F.C. players
Scotland international rugby sevens players
Scottish Exiles (rugby union) players
Male rugby sevens players